Robert Cunningham Graham Speirs or Spiers FRSE (1797–1847) was a 19th-century Scottish advocate and prison reformer. In later life he is largely referred to simply as Graham Speirs. He held the offices of Sheriff of Elgin and Moray from 1835 to 1840 and subsequently was Sheriff of Midlothian from 1840 until his death in 1847. He joined the Free Church at the Disruption of 1843. He was then involved in the Sites Committee trying to persuade landowners to allow the denomination to build churches and schools on their land.

Early life and career
Robert Cunningham Graham Speirs was born on 15 June 1797. He was the second son of Peter Speirs of Culcreuch, founder owner of a Mill at Fintry and his wife Martha Harriet Graham, daughter of Robert Cunninghame Graham of Gartmore (1735–1797) near Lake of Menteith. His  early  education  was  conducted  partly  at  the  High  School  of  Edinburgh,  and  partly  at  a  school  in  Warwickshire,  where  he  remained  until  December  1811.  He  then  entered  the  Royal  Navy,  and  continued  in  the  Naval  Service  for  five  years,  when,  directing  his  attention  to  the  study  of  law,  he  was  called  to  the  Bar  of  Scotland  in  1820.

Roles as sheriff
His professional career was distinguished by steady but not rapid  progress.  In 1830, Lord Advocate Jeffrey appointed Speirs an advocate-depute, and soon afterwards Speirs was appointed  sheriff of Elgin and Nairn.  Subsequently, in 1840, on a vacancy occurring in the metropolitan sheriffdom, he was offered and accepted the office of sheriff of Edinburgh, which he held until his death.  He was thus, for a time at least, removed from practice at the bar.

In 1835 he became Sheriff of Elgin. In 1840 he became Sheriff of Edinburgh and remained in that role until his death.

Church of Scotland elder
The   meeting  of  the  eldership  occurred  on  the  1st  February  1843. It  was  mentioned  at  the  time  in  the Witness  newspaper. The  Committee  formed  at  this  meeting  was  united  to  another  appointed  by  the  Convocation,  under  the  auspices  of  Thomas Chalmers. This is  explained  in  Dr  Chalmers'  Life  and  Correspondence  by  William Hanna.

Free Church roles
In the Disruption of 1843 he is listed as one of the church elders who left the Church of Scotland to join the Free Church of Scotland. Speirs heading up the Sites Committee set up because landlords across the country refused to give sites for the Free Church to build churches and schools.

A  renewed  application  to  Parliament  was  made  in  the  spring  of  1847, and  a  select  Committee  was  then  appointed  to  inquire  in  what  parts  of  Scotland,  and  under  what  circumstances,  sites  had  been  refused.  A  great  deal  of  evidence  was  laid  before  the  committee,  and,  amongst  others,  Thomas Chalmers,  and Graham Speirs,  as  Convener  of  the  Sites  Committee, were  especially  under  examination.

It was reported  to  the  House  of  Commons,  was  that  the  Committee  held  it to  be  proved  that  there  were  a  number  of  Christian  congregations  in  Scotland  who  have  no  place  of  worship  within  a  reasonable  distance  of  their  home,  where  they  can  unite  in  the  public  service  of  Almighty  God,  according  to  their  conscientious  convictions  of  religious  duty,  under  convenient  shelter  from  the  severity  of  a  northern  climate.  And  the  Committee  farther  reported  to  the  House  that  they  had  heard  with  pleasure,  in  course  of  the  evidence,  that  concessions  had  been  made  and  sites  granted  ;  and  they  expressed  an  earnest  hope  that  those  which  have  hitherto  been  refused  may  no  longer  be  withheld.

At the Assembly in 1846 Speirs gave voice to the fear that proprietors were “sending away or ejecting the Free Church population, in order that they may in that way take away the pretext for asking sites”. Sheriff Speirs had by this time produced at least a partial answer in the shape of an iron floating church, or churches — for he set no limit on the number which might be produced. Addressing the Commission of the Free Assembly in November 1845, he revealed that he had placed a contract with Mr John Wood of Port Glasgow for an iron church capable of containing 700 sitters. No  destination had yet been fixed on for it though in the course of his speech Kilmalie, Strachur and Lochcarron were mentioned as 
suitable. After delays one was completed and towed into place in Loch Sunart near Strontian starting on Wednesday 8 July 1846. At the cost of slight inconvenience to the congregation, a mooring was chosen below the township of Ardnastang, in the bay of Eilean a’Mhuirich, about 1.25 miles west of Strontian.

Other interests
Speirs had other interests besides the law and the church. In  this  work  his  associates  were  men of  all  classes  and  denominations — Dr  Kaye  Greville, John  Wigham  junior,  Dr  David  Maclagan,  Mr  George 
Forbes,  and  other  like-minded  citizens. In 1841 he was elected a Fellow of the Royal Society of Edinburgh. His proposer was David Welsh.

Death and legacy
He lived his final years at Granton House in north Edinburgh. A salt print photograph of him was taken by Hill & Adamson around 1845, in the early years of photography. He died on Christmas Eve, 24 December 1847. and is buried in Grange Cemetery in south Edinburgh. The grave lies in the centre of the north wall.

Ritchie suggest that Speirs's legacy to the Free Church was threefold. As was constantly emphasised, by birth he came from among the best families in the land. This was reinforced by the social connections he made to other gentry families from his schooldays, through his naval service, when called to the bar and through marriage. Previously, it had been characteristic of seceding churches that their adherents came from the more humble ranks of Scottish society.

While the Free Church could glory in its ministers, with men of the calibre of Chalmers, Cunningham, Candlish and Guthrie, Speirs made it clear that the church's moral authority was not restricted to its ministry. There was a powerful eldership as well and this was a strong consideration as the Free Church sought the moral high ground in its relations with the Church of Scotland.

There was also the practical aid Speirs had given through his service to the sites committee. By the time of his death the sites issue was not resolved, but it was clear that the trend of events was moving in a direction he would favour. The mixture of skilled advocacy and patient negotiation was bearing fruit. In parallel with that policy Speirs had acted decisively to win the propaganda battle, through the construction of an iron floating church and by the lithographs he commissioned of scenes of site-refusal.

Family

In 1820 he married Catherine Ann Grant (1804-1871) daughter of Francis Grant of Kilgraston (see grave), and left a daughter, Anne Oliphant Speirs (1833 - 1907), who married George Home of Blackadder and inherited Culcreuch Castle, which she sold in 1890, from her uncle. Speirs lived at a very large Georgian town house at 46 Great King Street.

References

Citations

Sources

1797 births
1847 deaths
Scottish lawyers
Fellows of the Royal Society of Edinburgh
Free Church of Scotland people